Ichneutica similis is a moth of the family Noctuidae. It is endemic to New Zealand. This species is found only in certain parts of the North Island, in the western side of the South Island and on Stewart Island. It inhabits peatlands as well as inland and coastal wetlands.  The life history of this species is unknown and the host species of its larvae has yet to be confirmed. It has been hypothesised that larval host species might be within the Empodisma genus as well as possibly the species Apodasmia similis.

Taxonomy 
This species was first described by Alfred Philpott in 1924 from specimens collected in the Gouland Downs near the Heaphy Track. The male holotype specimen is held in the New Zealand Arthropod Collection. Philpott originally named the species Persectania similis. J. S. Dugdale discussed this species in his 1988 catalogue and placed it within the Tmetolophota genus. In 2019 Robert Hoare undertook a major review of New Zealand Noctuidae. During this review the genus Ichneutica was greatly expanded and the genus Tmetolophota was subsumed into that genus as a synonym. As a result of this review, this species is now known as Ichneutica similis.

Description 
Philpott described the adults of the species as follows:

The wingspan of the male adult of this species is between 35 and 37 mm and for the adult female of between 36 and 38 mm. I. similis might possibly be confused with I. emmersonorum however I. emmersonorum has wider and darker coloured forewing with a less distinct kidney mark.

Distribution 
It is endemic to New Zealand. This species is found only in certain parts of the North Island, in the western side of the South Island and on Stewart Island.

Habitat 
The species inhabits peatlands as well as inland and coastal wetlands. Although it has yet to be collected in Northland gumland locations, it is possible it also inhabits these gumlands as moth species with similar preferences in habitat are also found in these locations.

Behaviour 
The adults of this species are on the wing from January to March.

Life history and host species 

The life history of this species is unknown and the host species of its larvae has yet to be confirmed. It has been hypothesised that larval host species might be within the Empodisma genus as well as possibly Apodasmia similis.

References

Moths described in 1924
Moths of New Zealand
Hadeninae
Endemic fauna of New Zealand
Taxa named by Alfred Philpott
Endemic moths of New Zealand